Sir David Nunes Nabarro  (born 26 August 1949) is a Special Envoy on Covid-19 for the World Health Organization. He has made his career in the international civil service, working for either the Secretary-General of the United Nations or the Director-General of the World Health Organization. Since February 2020, he has helped the DGWHO deal with the COVID-19 pandemic.

Early life and education 
Nabarro is the son of the late Sir John David Nunes Nabarro, whose cousin was the late Sir Gerald Nabarro, MP. He was formerly consultant endocrinologist at University College Hospital (UCH) and Middlesex Hospital, London. He attended Oundle School in Northamptonshire, leaving in the summer of 1966.

In a gap year between school and university, Nabarro was a community service volunteer. He spent a year as the organiser of Youth Action, York. A BBC television documentary was made about his volunteer work.

Nabarro studied at the University of Oxford and the University of London, and qualified as a physician in 1973. He is a member of the Faculty of Public Health (FPH) and the Royal College of Physicians by distinction (where he is also a Fellow).

Career

Early career 
Nabarro worked as a medical officer in North Iraq for Save the Children, before joining the United Kingdom's (UK) National Health Service (NHS) for a short time. From 1976 to 1978, Nabarro worked as District Child Health Officer in Dhankuta District, Nepal. Later, he moved to the London School of Hygiene and Tropical Medicine, and in 1982, he became Regional Manager for the Save the Children Fund in South Asia, based in the region. In 1985 he joined the University of Liverpool Medical School as senior lecturer in International Community Health.

He moved to the Overseas Development Administration (now part of Foreign, Commonwealth and Development Office) as a strategic adviser for health and population in East Africa, based in Nairobi, in 1989.

Nabarro later took up the post of chief health and population adviser at the Overseas Development Administration (London office) in 1990, and moved on to become director of human development (as well as chief health adviser) in 1997.

World Health Organization (1999–2005)
Nabarro joined the WHO in January 1999, as project manager of Roll Back Malaria, then moved to the Office of the Director General as executive director in March 2000. In this capacity, he worked with the director general Gro Harlem Brundtland for two years on a variety of issues, including the Commission on Macroeconomics and Health, Health Systems Assessments and the creation of the Global Fund to Fight AIDS, Tuberculosis and Malaria. As part of this work, he became for 1999-2001 a member of the board of directors of Medicines for Malaria Venture.

Nabarro transferred to the Sustainable Development and Healthy Environments cluster in 2003 and was appointed representative of the DG for health action in crises in July 2003.

Nabarro was stationed in the Canal Hotel in Baghdad, Iraq, when it was bombed on the afternoon of 19 August 2003. The blast targeted the UN, which had used the hotel as its headquarters in Iraq since 1991.

He has also coordinated support for health aspects of crisis response operations in Darfur, Sudan, and in countries affected by the 2004 Indian Ocean earthquake and Tsunami.

UN System senior coordinator (2005–2014) 
In September 2005, Nabarro was seconded from WHO and appointed senior UN system coordinator for avian and human influenza by secretary-general of the UN Kofi Annan to ensure that the UN system made an effective and coordinated contribution to the global effort to control the epidemic of avian influenza (also known as 'bird flu').

Coordinator of Global Food Security (HLTF) (2008–2014) 
In January 2009, Nabarro took on the responsibility of coordinating the UN system's High-Level Task Force on Global Food Security (HLTF). The HLTF brought together 23 different organizations, funds, programs and other entities from within the UN family, as well as the Bretton Woods Institutions, the World Trade Organization (WTO), and the Organisation for Economic Co-operation and Development (OECD), and tasked them with establishing a common strategy for addressing food and nutrition insecurity in a more sustainable, coordinated and comprehensive way. Nabarro left the HLTF coordinator position in 2014 and was succeeded by Giuseppe Fantozzi.

Special representative of the UN Secretary-General (2009–2017) 

In November 2009 UN Secretary-General Ban Ki-moon appointed Nabarro as special representative on food security and nutrition. As special representative, Nabarro's role was to:
 Align UN system action on people's food security, livelihood resilience and sustainable agriculture in the face of changing climates
 Support functioning of the Committee on World Food Security 
 Oversee UN Secretary-General's Zero Hunger Challenge

Coordinator of nutrition movement (2010–2015) 
In September 2010, Nabarro was appointed coordinator of the Scaling Up Nutrition (SUN) Movement. SUN brings together government officials, civil society, the UN, donors, businesses and researchers in a collective effort to improve nutrition.

Betimes, he became Member of the WHO Commission on Ending Childhood Obesity (2016), 2013–2014.

Special envoy on Ebola (2014–2015) 

In August 2014, Nabarro was designated as special envoy of the UN Secretary-General on Ebola, with the responsibility for ensuring that the UN system makes an effective and coordinated contribution to the global effort to control the outbreak of Ebola. The epidemic is believed to have begun in December 2013 with the death of a 2-year-old boy in a remote area of Guinea, but was not recognized until March 2014. For several months the epidemic was spreading. This is something that public health experts in the affected locations, such as Medecins Sans Frontières (Doctors Without Borders), claimed was due to a deeply flawed and delayed response by health and government officials.

In an interview later in 2015, once Ebola had largely been brought under control, Nabarro said that when he started working on Ebola in 2014, he "was aware that we were in the middle of a disease outbreak of enormous proportions. The number of people getting sick was doubling every week. Facilities were completely overloaded. Communities were in a state of despair." He added that the international community had learned important lessons from the epidemic: "The world is going to be different as a result of this Ebola outbreak, much more confident, much more assured, and much, much more capable to ensure the well-being of its citizens."

Chair of the Advisory Group on Reform at WHO (2015–2016) 
Nabarro was responsible for leading a high-level advisory group to guide reform of WHO's response to outbreaks and emergencies, prepare reports based on the group's recommendations and advise on the manner of their implementation.

Head of UN's response to cholera in Haiti (2016–2017) 
In 2016 Nabarro was tapped to lead the UN's response to Haiti's cholera epidemic. Cholera had killed more than 10,000 Haitians in the six years since the disease was introduced by UN peacekeepers in 2010. After UN Secretary General Ban Ki-Moon issued a long overdue apology for the UN's "role" in the epidemic, Nabarro oversaw efforts to raise $400 million from UN member states to fund the Secretary General's proposed "New Approach" to cholera in Haiti. Nabarro was the second UN appointee to work on the cholera crisis in Haiti. Pedro Modrano Rojas previously served as a senior coordinator for the cholera effort, but left at the end of an 18-month term, stating that he was disappointed by the international community's "failure to acknowledge the fact that we have in Haiti the largest epidemic in the western hemisphere." Nabarro's efforts were no more successful—as a result of a lack of support from the UN Secretary General and from member states, Nabarro was only able to raise $2.7 million of the promised $400 million before being replaced by Josette Sheeran—though Sheeran would face the same obstacles as Nabarro.

Special adviser on Sustainable Development and Climate Change (2016–2017) 
In January 2016, Nabarro was appointed special adviser on the 2030 Agenda for Sustainable Development by then UN Secretary-General Ban Ki-moon.

One of Nabarro's responsibilities in this role were to lead the UN's response to the cholera epidemic its peacekeepers sparked in Haiti in October 2010 when untreated, infected sewage from a UN base was deposited in the country's main river system. As of August 2016, at least 10,000 people had died and more than 800,000 have been sickened in the epidemic.

Candidate for WHO Director-General (2016–2017) 
In September 2016, Nabarro was nominated by the UK's First May ministry to stand for the post of director-general (DG) of the World Health Organization (WHO). An article co-authored by the UK's chief medical officer, Sally Davies, was published in The Lancet. It outlined the criteria that the next DG of the WHO must fulfill.

Nabarro was one of six candidates put forward by their individual governments to succeed DGWHO Margaret Chan. Nabarro outlined his four priorities as follows:

 Alignment with the Sustainable Development Goals
 Transforming the WHO to respond to outbreaks and health emergencies
 Trusted engagement with Member States
 Advancing people-centred health policies.

On Tuesday 23 May, at the 70th World Health Assembly, Nabarro came second in the race to become the next director general, receiving 50 votes to Dr Tedros Adhanom's 133 in the third and final round of voting.

Imperial College London Professor (2018–present) 
In 2018 he was appointed Professor at the Institute of Global Health Innovation at Imperial College London and then appointed in 2019 as Co-Director with surgeon Ara Darzi, Baron Darzi of Denham.

COVID-19 pandemic 
On 21 February 2020, he was appointed as one of six Special Envoys from the DGWHO, who were tasked to respond to the COVID-19 pandemic. In October 2020, Nabarro gave an interview with The Spectator on YouTube in which he highlighted the WHO's updated position on lockdowns in regards to national responses to COVID. As a Special Envoy on COVID-19 for the World Health Organization, Nabarro said: "We in the World Health Organization do not advocate lockdowns as the primary means of control of this virus ... the only time we believe a lockdown is justified is to buy you time to reorganize, regroup, rebalance your resources, protect your health workers who are exhausted, but by and large, we'd rather not do it."

He argued that lockdowns should be used as "circuit breakers" and as a reserve measure to control the virus rather than a primary measure. In an interview with BBC Radio 4, he cautioned against a full national lockdown, describing it as "a very extreme restriction on economic and social life" that temporarily "freezes the virus in place". He said: "You don't want to use those as your primary, and I stress that, primary, means of containment. Because in the end living with the virus as a constant threat means maintaining the capacity to find people with the disease and isolating them."

His comments were taken by some as meaning that the WHO did not support lockdowns. Rather, he emphasises that they do not support lockdowns as a primary measure for tackling the virus, and instead believe that having a robust test, trace and isolate system should be the priority for all governments, ensuring all those who are positive or who have been close to those infected are quarantined, with lockdown as "the reserve that you use to take the heat out of the system when things are really bad".

Honours, recognition and awards 
World Food Prize 2018 (dubbed Nobel Prize for Agriculture): Awarded together with Lawrence Haddad for their individual and complementary global leadership in elevating maternal and child undernutrition to a central issue within the food security and development dialogue at national and international levels. They have been cutting the number of stunted children in the world by 10 million by lobbying governments and donors to improve nutrition.
Helen Keller Humanitarian Award: Awarded for work on positioning malnutrition within the development dialogue and for ensuring an effective response to Ebola, 2015
 Sight and Life Nutrition Leadership Award (together with the Scaling Up Nutrition Movement): For work in catalysing sustainable change in global nutrition, 2012
 Distinguished Service Award from Health Policy Institute, Kansas University of Medicine & Biosciences: For outstanding Health Policy Leadership, 2008

Nabarro was appointed Commander of the Order of the British Empire (CBE) in 1992 for services to international public health and Knight Commander of the Order of St Michael and St George (KCMG) in the 2023 New Year Honours for services to global health.

References

External links 
 
 

1949 births
Living people
21st-century Sephardi Jews
Alumni of the London School of Hygiene & Tropical Medicine
Alumni of the University of London
Academics of the London School of Hygiene & Tropical Medicine
Alumni of the University of Oxford
People educated at Oundle School
British public health doctors
English Sephardi Jews
British officials of the United Nations
United Nations operations in Iraq
World Health Organization officials
Special Representatives of the Secretary-General of the United Nations
Commanders of the Order of the British Empire
Knights Commander of the Order of St Michael and St George